The 2021 Eastern Kentucky Colonels football team represented Eastern Kentucky University during the 2021 NCAA Division I FCS football season. They were led by Walt Wells in his second season.
The Colonels played their home games at Roy Kidd Stadium and competed as a member of the ASUN Conference.

The ASUN Conference and Western Athletic Conference announced the formation of the WAC-ASUN Challenge (AQ7) for the 2021 season on February 23, 2021.  The Challenge included the four fully qualified Division I (FCS) members of the WAC (Abilene Christian, Lamar, Sam Houston, and Stephen F. Austin) and Central Arkansas, Eastern Kentucky, and Jacksonville State of the ASUN Conference.  The winner of the challenge received an auto-bid to the NCAA Division I FCS football playoffs.

Previous season

The Colonels finished the 2020–21 season with 3–6 overall record.

Schedule

References

Eastern Kentucky
Eastern Kentucky Colonels football seasons
Eastern Kentucky Colonels football